Tomás Agustín Paschetta (born 3 August 1993) is an Argentine professional footballer who plays as a centre-back for UE Sant Julià.

Career
Before playing at senior level for Nueva Chicago, Paschetta spent time in the youth of Defensores de Belgrano. In 2015, Nueva Chicago selected the defender on the substitutes bench for a Primera División fixture but he didn't come on in a goalless draw with Colón; that came in a season which concluded with relegation to Primera B Nacional. Paschetta subsequently made twelve appearances in the 2016 campaign, whilst also netting goals against Central Córdoba and Instituto as they finished seventh.

In July 2019, Paschetta moved to Primera B Metropolitana side Fénix de Pilar. After a year at the club, he moved abroad and joined Italian Serie D club Lanusei. However, without making his debut for the team, he left and signed with fellow Italian club Siracusa on 10 September 2021. He left the team at the end of 2021. In January 2022, Paschetta moved to Andorran club UE Sant Julià.

Career statistics
.

References

External links

1993 births
Living people
Argentine footballers
Argentine expatriate footballers
Sportspeople from Buenos Aires Province
Association football defenders
Primera Nacional players
Defensores de Belgrano footballers
Nueva Chicago footballers
Club Atlético Fénix players
UE Sant Julià players
Argentine expatriate sportspeople in Italy
Argentine expatriate sportspeople in Andorra
Expatriate footballers in Italy
Expatriate footballers in Andorra